Mister Wong was one of the largest European free social bookmarking web services.

History
The website was a German startup, established in 2006 by Kai Tietjen. The service ceased operation after being sold for €2500 in October 2016. 

The service was available in German, English, Russian, Chinese, Spanish and French.

Origin of name
The website extols its users to "Wong the Web!", a reference to the practice of Wonging, often employed by card counters in Blackjack.

Controversy
Mister Wong's original logo, depicting a "cartoonish, nerdy East Asian man", brought on protests from many Asian-Americans. The website's creator subsequently issued an apology and removed the logo.

See also
Delicious

Notes

Social bookmarking websites
German social networking websites
Internet properties established in 2006